The Crown Council was an institution that advised the King of Romania. Informal between 1866 and 1938, it was formalized by the 1938 Constitution, in effect for two years. The forum met on occasions of great national importance. It had a purely advisory role, and was convoked by the King on the government's advice.

In 2010, the council was once again re-established by King Michael I on October 10, which succeeded the Political and Advisory Committee’ set up by the King during his exile and after 1989 Romanian Revolution.

List of Crown Councils 
The Crown Councils that took place and the issues discussed were the following:

Institutionalization of the Crown Council 
At the beginning of 1938, King Carol II decided to abolish the parliamentary regime and established a regime of personal authority, enshrined in law by drafting, approving by plebiscite and then promulgating a new Constitution. Several measures were taken to reorganize the state, which included: censorship, suspension of the immovability of magistrates and the stability of civil servants, dissolution of political parties, creation of a "mass" party (National Renaissance Front), professional organization in guilds, reform administrative etc.

Against this background, on March 30, 1938, a decree-law was issued establishing the Crown Council as a distinct political organism. According to the decree-law, the members of the Council were to be appointed by royal decree, from current or former dignitaries of the state, church, army and royal court or from prominent personalities of the country, the number of members not being limited. The Council maintained its consultative status.

Members

Historical members
The members of the Council bore the title of royal adviser, and received a monthly allowance of 50,000 lei. These were the following (those for whom the date is not specified were appointed on March 30, 1938):
 Patriarch Miron Cristea, who died on March 6, 1939
 Marshal Alexandru Averescu, who died on October 30, 1938
 Marshal Constantin Prezan
 General Artur Văitoianu
 Gheorghe Mironescu
 Nicolae Iorga
 Constantin Angelescu
 Gheorghe Tătărescu
 Constantin Argetoianu
 General 
 Alexandru C. Cuza, from June 16, 1939
 Victor Iamandi, from November 23, 1939
 Ion Mihalache, from April 17, 1940, resigner on June 26
 Victor Antonescu, from April 18, 1940
 Patriarch Nicodim Munteanu, from August 20, 1940
 Metropolitan of Transylvania Nicolae Bălan, from August 20, 1940
 Metropolitan of the Romanian Church United with Rome, Greek-Catholic Alexandru Nicolescu, from August 20, 1940.

2010–2017
 King Michael I of Romania
 Crown Princess Margareta of Romania
 Prince Radu
 Archduke Lorenz, Archduke of Austria-Este

Current members
 Margareta, Custodian of the Crown of Romania
 Princess Elena of Romania
 Archduke Lorenz, Archduke of Austria-Este

See also 
 Privy council

Bibliography 
Ion Mamina, Consilii de Coroană, Editura Enciclopedică, București, 1997

References

External links
 Crown Council of Romania

Kingdom of Romania
House of Romania
Political history of Romania
Romanian monarchy
1866 establishments in Romania
1938 establishments in Romania
1940 disestablishments in Romania